The 1994 National Invitation Tournament was the 1994 edition of the annual NCAA college basketball competition.

Of note, in Kansas State's 115–77 victory over Fresno State in the quarterfinals, Askia Jones of Kansas State set the NCAA postseason record of 14 three-point field goals.  His final total of 62 points, spurred by nine consecutive successful three-point shots bridging the first and second halves, was also the second-highest scoring output in major-college postseason history.

Doremus Bennerman of Siena won MVP after scoring 174 points in 5 NIT games. The total remains a tournament record.

Selected teams
Below is a list of the 32 teams selected for the tournament.

Brackets
Below are the four first round brackets, along with the four-team championship bracket.

Semifinals & finals

See also
 1994 National Women's Invitational Tournament
 1994 NCAA Division I men's basketball tournament
 1994 NCAA Division II men's basketball tournament
 1994 NCAA Division III men's basketball tournament
 1994 NCAA Division I women's basketball tournament
 1994 NCAA Division II women's basketball tournament
 1994 NCAA Division III women's basketball tournament
 1994 NAIA Division I men's basketball tournament
 1994 NAIA Division II men's basketball tournament
 1994 NAIA Division I women's basketball tournament
 1994 NAIA Division I women's basketball tournament

References

National Invitation
National Invitation Tournament
1990s in Manhattan
Basketball in New York City
College sports in New York City
Madison Square Garden
National Invitation Tournament
National Invitation Tournament
Sports competitions in New York City
Sports in Manhattan